The gallopheasants (genus Lophura) are pheasants of the family Phasianidae.  The genus comprises 11 species and several subspecies.

Taxonomy

Lophura hatinhensis and Lophura hoogerwerfi are sometimes considered subspecies, leaving this genus with only 11 species. Other subspecies are also sometimes considered distinct species.

Lophura × imperialis - imperial pheasant

References